Võ Thị Sáu (1933 – 23 January 1952) was a Vietnamese schoolgirl who fought as a guerilla against the French occupiers of Vietnam, then part of French Indochina. She was captured, tried, convicted and executed by the French colonialists in 1952, becoming the first woman to be executed at Côn Sơn Prison. Today she is considered a Vietnamese national martyr and heroine.

Biography
She was born in Phước Thọ Commune, Đất Đỏ District, in 1933. At the time, this was part of Bà Rịa Province, but today is a part of Long Đất District, Bà Rịa–Vũng Tàu province. In 1948, she became a contact for a local guerilla group after many of her friends and family joined the Việt Minh.

When she was 14 she threw a grenade at a group of French soldiers in the crowded market area, killing 1 of them and injuring 12. She escaped undetected. Late in 1949, she threw another grenade at a Vietnamese canton chief — a local man responsible for executing many suspected Việt Minh sympathizers. The grenade failed to explode, and she was caught by the French authorities.

Sáu was imprisoned in three different facilities, the last of which was a police post near Côn Sơn Prison in the Côn Đảo Islands. She was executed on 23 January 1952, at the age of 18 by firing squad in the corner of Bagne III; it is said that she refused to wear a blindfold.

Today, Sáu is considered a nationalist martyr and a symbol of revolutionary spirit. She is venerated by the Vietnamese people as an ancestral spirit, and has amassed almost a cult-like following of devotees who venerate her grave in Hàng Dương Cemetery on Côn Sơn Island. There is also a temple dedicated to her in her hometown of Đất Đỏ. Many Vietnamese cities and towns also have streets and schools named after her.

See also

 Lê Văn Tám
 Nguyễn Văn Trỗi
 Võ Thị Thắng

References

1933 births
1952 deaths
People from Bà Rịa-Vũng Tàu Province
Executed Vietnamese people
Women in warfare post-1945
Women in war in Vietnam
People executed by the French Fourth Republic
People executed by France by firing squad
Executed revolutionaries
People executed for attempted murder